Emelie Anna Berggren (born 15 September 1982) is an ice hockey player from Sweden. She won a bronze medal at the 2002 Winter Olympics.
As team captain she led one of Sweden's best ice hockey teams to many gold medals in both the Swedish and European league.

References 

1982 births
Ice hockey players at the 2002 Winter Olympics
Living people
Olympic bronze medalists for Sweden
Olympic ice hockey players of Sweden
Olympic medalists in ice hockey
Medalists at the 2002 Winter Olympics
Swedish women's ice hockey defencemen